How About A Nice Game of Chess? is a 1984 video game published by Odesta.

Gameplay
How About A Nice Game of Chess? is a game in which the player can go to earlier moves and replay, trade sides with the computer, ask the computer for advice, or play against a human opponent.

Reception
Bob Proctor reviewed the game for Computer Gaming World, and stated that "You have no excuse not to learn the game with this package on your shelf. There is a complete on-screen tutorial that covers how the pieces move and the rules of the game."

Reviews
Hardcore Computist
Info

References

External links
Review in Commodore Microcomputers
Review in Washington Apple Pi
Article in Ahoy!
Review in Hardcore Computist

1984 video games
Apple II games
Chess software
Commodore 64 games
Video games developed in the United States